The United States Air Force's  3rd Combat Communications Group (3 CCG) was a United States Air Force combat communications unit located at Tinker AFB, Oklahoma.

The 3 CCG inactivated 30 September 2013, affecting more than 700 military billets.

Media reports state that the 3 CCG was inactivated by order of the 2013 National Defense Authorization Act. However, no part of the act addresses the inactivation of the unit and no Air Force communications or tactical comm-electronics budget requests were denied by Congress.

Squadrons 
 31st Combat Communications Squadron
 32nd Combat Communications Squadron
 33rd Combat Communications Squadron
 34th Combat Communications Squadron

History
With Allied victory in Europe and the end of World War II came the demobilization and withdrawal of all US Air Force units from the United Kingdom. Their absence, however, was short lived. In 1948, in response to the Berlin blockade, the US deployed long-range B-29 strategic bombers to four East Anglian bases. In early 1951 growing size and complexity of the American military presence required a larger command and organizational structure that could meet the needs of the increased operations (both strategic and tactical.) Third Air Force was activated on 1 May 1951 to oversee tactical air operations from the United Kingdom and provide logistics and support to the Seventh Air Division. The 3rd Combat Communications Group lineage stems from the 3rd Communications Group, which was active in South Ruislip, England, as part of the Third Air Force.  The 3rd Communications Group was established on 16 May 1957 and was activated on 8 July 1957. At the times of its activation in 1957 the 3rd Communications Group consisted of the 603rd Communications and the 605th Communications Squadrons.

The 1960s saw continuous fluctuations in the US Air Force presence in the United Kingdom. In 1961, some bases were returned and numbered air force activities merged. Support squadrons were eliminated at South Ruislip. On 1 July 1962 the 3rd Communications Group was inactivated.
The 3rd was then reactivated and redesignated as the 3rd Mobile Communications Group on 20 May 1964.

On 1 July 1964, the 3rd Mobile Communications Group organized at Tinker Air Force Base, Oklahoma, and assigned to the Air Force Communications Service (later, Air Force Communications Command (AFCC)) (AFCS G-28, 26 May 1964.) Under provisions of AFP 210-1-4, the 3rd Mobile Communications Group inherited the history, awards and emblem of the 3rd Communications Group. The 3rd Mobile Communications Group took the void of the 3rd Airways and Air Communications Service Mobile Squadron that was established at Tinker AFB, OK on 1 December 1952. Upon establishment of AFCS, the 3rd AACS was redesignated 3rd Mobile Communications Squadron (AFCS G-2, 1 July 61), but unfortunately would not be incorporated into the 3rd Mobile Communications Group history and awards. Although no former recognized lineage with the 3rd AACS and 3rd Mobile Communications Squadron exist, it shares a common history of people, equipment and Tinker AFB.
Upon its early reactivation in the continental United States it incorporated the 1869th Facility Checking Squadron, 1 October 1966 – 1 September 1971; 7518th Communications Squadron and the 7519th Communications Squadron, 1 September 1959 – 1 July 1962. Over the years it was redesignated many times: on 24 March 1976 it was designated the 3rd Combat Communications Group; on 15 August 1984 it was designated the 3rd Information Systems Group; and returned to the designation 3rd Combat Communications Group on 1 October 1986. Since 1964 it has been assigned to various organizations of the Air Force Communications Service/Command, on 1 October 1990 it became part of the Tactical Air Command, and then Air Combat Command.

On 5 October 2009, the 3rd CCG was realigned underneath the newly activated 689th Combat Communications Wing, headquartered at Robins Air Force Base, Georgia. With this realignment, the group now fell under the Twenty-Fourth Air Force and Air Force Space Command.

The 3rd Combat Communications Group inactivated on 30 September 2013.

Assignments
 8 July 1957 – Activated under the Third Air Force as the 3rd Communications Group
 1 July 1962 – 3rd Communications Group inactivated
 20 May 1964 – Reactivated as 3rd Mobile Communications Group
 Assigned to Air Force Communications Command
 24 March 1976 – Designated 3rd Combat Communications Group
 15 August 1984 – Designated 3rd Informations Systems Group
 1 October 1986 – Redesignated 3rd Combat Communications Group
 1 October 1990 – Assigned to Tactical Air Command (to be later acquired by Air Combat Command)
 5 October 2009 – Realigned underneath the 689th Combat Communications Wing, Twenty-Fourth Air Force, Air Force Space Command
 30 September 2013 - Inactivated

Major command
 Air Force Communications Command (1964–1990)
 Tactical Air Command (1990–1992)
 Air Combat Command (1992–2009)
 Air Force Space Command (2009 – 2013)

Commanders
 Maj James M Dunn (May 1957 – Jun 1961)
 Lt Col Gilbert H Bertie (Jun 1961 – Jun 1962)
 Lt Col Stanley J Washuk (Jun 1962 – May 1964)
 Lt Col John R Coonan (May 1964 – Jul 1964)
 Col William T Judkins (Jul 1964 – Dec 1965)
 Col John T Ford (Dec 1965 – Aug 1968)
 Col Ralph E McDaniel (Aug 1968 – Sep 1969)
 Col Francis W Fender (Sep 1969 – Mar 1971)
 Col Robert W Pool (Mar 1971 – Apr 1973)
 Col John D Nolan (Apr 1973 – Dec 1973)
 Col Lowell F Bohn (Dec 1973 – Jun 1976)
 Col Paul W Edwards (Jun 1976 – Jul 1978)
 Col Ronald H McKinney (Jul 1978 – Sep 1980)
 Col James Selph (Sep 1980 – Dec 1982)
 Col Gerald L Boynton (Dec 1982 – May 1984)
 Col Phillip J Lurie (May 1984 – Jan 1986)
 Col Buford R Witt (Jan 1986 – Jul 1988)
 Col Carl E Stoops (Jul 1988 – Aug 1990)
 Col Robert A Allen Jr (Aug 1990 – Jul 1992)
 Col Dale W Meyerrose (Jul 1992 – Jun 1994)
 Col J D Wells (Jun 1994 – May 1995)
 Col Stephen R Quick (May 1995 – Jul 1997)
 Col David J Kovach (Jul 1997 – May 1999)
 Col Daniel R Dinkins (May 1999 – Jul 2001)
 Col Gregory L Brundidge (Jul 2001 – May 2003)
 Col Carl Williamson (May 2003 – Apr 2005)
 Col Tracy A Amos (Apr 2005 – Feb 2006)
 Col James H Appleyard Jr (Mar 2006 – Apr 2008)
 Col Thomas A Byrge Jr (Apr 2008 – Jun 2010)
 Col David S Babyak (Jun 2010 – June 2012)
 Col Matthew C Harris (Jun 2012 – Sep 2013)

Decorations 
 Air Force Outstanding Unit Award 
 1 July 1960 – 1 February 1962 (DAFSO G-92/62)
 1 January 1965 – 31 December 1966 (DAFSO GB-239/67)
 1 May 1970 – 31 December 1971 (DAFSO GB-407/74)
 1 January 1972 – 31 December 1972 (DAFSO GB-602/73)
 1 January 1974 – 31 December 1974 (DAFSO GB-682/75)
 1 January 1975 – 31 December 1975 (DAFSO GB-955/76)
 1 January 1978 – 31 December 1978 (DAFSO GB-635/79)
 12 November 1984 – 3 June 1985 (DAFSO GB-61/85)
 1 January 1986 – 31 December 1987 (DAFSO GB-433/88)
 1 May 1990 – 30 April 1992 (TAC SO GA-50/92)
 1 April 1992 – 31 March 1994 (ACC SO GA-325/94)
 1 April 1994 – 31 December 1994 (ACC SO GA-307/95)
 1 January 1995 – 31 May 1996 (ACC SO GA-83/96)
 1 June 1996 – 31 May 1997 (ACC SO GA-61/97)
 1 June 1997 – 31 May 1999 (ACC SO GA-56/99)
 1 June 1999 – 31 May 2001 (ACC SO GA-88/01)
 1 June 2001 – 31 May 2002 (ACC SO GA-091)
 1 June 2007 – 31 May 2008
 Armed Forces Expeditionary Streamer for GRENADA 1983 (AFP 900-2, AFMPC/DPMASA ltr, dtd 3 June 1990)
 Air Force Meritorious Unit Award 
 1 June 2003 – 31 May 2005 (USCENTAF G-0372)
 2008
 Maj. Gen. Harold M. McClelland Award (2005 AF level)

History Site
Please visit www.3rdherd.org for articles, pictures, and stories about the Herd for historical purposes.
There will be pictures, videos, and an archive of material for viewing, editing and contributing.

References

Military units and formations in Oklahoma
Combat Communications 0003